Lyve from Steel Town is a live album by the 'post-plane crash' lineup of American rock band Lynyrd Skynyrd. It has two discs; the last two tracks on the second disc are exclusive interviews with the band. The concert was also released as a live VHS and DVD. The tracks were recorded at Star Lake Amphitheatre in Burgettstown, Pennsylvania (outside Pittsburgh), on July 15, 1997. Both the album and the video were certified Gold by the RIAA.

Track listings

Disc 1
"We Ain't Much Different" (Gary Rossington, Johnny Van Zant, Rickey Medlocke, Hughie Thomasson, Mike Estes) – 4:10
"Saturday Night Special" (Ed King, Ronnie Van Zant) – 5:45
"What's Your Name?" (Gary Rossington, Ronnie Van Zant) – 3:56
"On the Hunt" (Allen Collins, Ronnie Van Zant) – 6:17
"You Got That Right" (Steve Gaines, Ronnie Van Zant) – 4:47
"Voodoo Lake" (Johnny Van Zant, Chris Eddy, Bob Britt) – 5:11
"That Smell" (Allen Collins, Ronnie Van Zant) – 6:17
"Bring It On" (Gary Rossington, Johnny Van Zant, Rickey Medlocke, Hughie Thomasson) – 6:04
"Simple Man" (Gary Rossington, Ronnie Van Zant) – 7:46
"I Know a Little" (Steve Gaines) – 4:57
"Berneice" (Gary Rossington, Johnny Van Zant, Rickey Medlocke, Hughie Thomasson, Dennis E. Sumner) – 3:58
"Gimme Three Steps" (Allen Collins, Ronnie Van Zant) – 5:52

Disc 2
"Sweet Home Alabama" (Ed King, Gary Rossington, Ronnie Van Zant) – 6:42
"Travelin' Man" (Leon Wilkeson, Ronnie Van Zant) – 4:19
"Free Bird" (Allen Collins, Ronnie Van Zant) – 13:40
"Lynyrd Skynyrd Interview #1" – 11:05
"Lynyrd Skynyrd Interview #2" – 9:12

Personnel
Johnny Van Zant – vocals
Gary Rossington – lead, rhythm and slide guitars
Leon Wilkeson – bass, vocals
Hughie Thomasson – lead, rhythm, slide and acoustic guitars; vocals
Rickey Medlocke – lead, rhythm, slide and acoustic guitars; vocals
Billy Powell – piano, Hammond B3 organ
Owen Hale – drums and percussion
Dale Krantz Rossington – backing vocals
Carol Chase – backing vocals

Certifications

References

Lynyrd Skynyrd live albums
1998 live albums
CMC International live albums
Lynyrd Skynyrd video albums
Live video albums
1998 video albums